Maughan is a surname. Notable people with the surname include:

Ariel Maughan (1923–1997), American professional basketball player
Arthur Maughan, American wrestler
Clyde Maughan, American engineer
Cynthia Maughan (born 1949), American video artist
Deryck Maughan (born 1947), British businessman and philanthropist
George Maughan (1910–2003), Canadian boxer who competed in the 1932 Summer Olympics
James Maughan (1826–1871), Methodist minister in Adelaide, South Australia, father of Milton Moss Maughan
John Maughan Barnett (1867–1938), New Zealand organist, choirmaster, pianist, composer and conductor
Margaret Maughan (1928–2020), British Paralympic archer
Milton Moss Maughan (1856–1921), South Australian educationalist, son of James Maughan
Monica Maughan (1933–2010), Australian actor with roles in film, theatre, radio and television
Noel Maughan, Australian politician, Nationals member for Rodney in the Victorian Legislative Assembly 1989–2006
Peter Maughan (1811–1871), early Mormon pioneer who settled the Cache Valley of Utah under the direction of Brigham Young
Rex Maughan, the founder, president, and CEO of Forever Living Products and Terry Labs
Russell Maughan, pioneer aviator and U.S. military pilot
Sharon Maughan (born 1950), British actress
Susan Maughan (born 1938), English singer who released successful singles in the 1960s
William Maughan (footballer) (1894–1916), English footballer
William Ryott Maughan (1863–1933), English-born Australian politician